Shavick Entertainment is a Canadian film and television production company, owned and operated in Vancouver, British Columbia by James Shavick and his wife, former British Columbia politician Joy MacPhail. The company has primarily produced television films, most notably the Donald Strachey mystery series starring Chad Allen, as well as a few theatrical films and a number of television series, including The New Addams Family, Los Luchadores, Young Blades and Breaker High.

The company also owns a majority interest in the Canadian specialty channel OUTtv. Prior to 2012, Pink Triangle Press and Peace Point Entertainment were also minority partners in the channel, but Shavick bought out their shares in 2012.

The firm was established in 1993, after Shavick returned to Canada from a stint as a producer with RKO Pictures.

References

External links
 Official website

1993 establishments in British Columbia
Film production companies of Canada
Television production companies of Canada
Companies based in Vancouver
Entertainment companies established in 1993
Canadian companies established in 1993